is a 2019 battle royale puzzle video game developed by Arika and published by Nintendo for the Nintendo Switch. It is an online multiplayer adaptation of Tetris (1984): players move and drop puzzle pieces called tetrominoes onto a playing board, and must clear rows by filling them completely with pieces. Players lose if tetrominoes overflow off the top of the board. Matches contain 99 players, who send additional rows to other players' boards by clearing a row on their own board; whoever is the last man standing without an overflowed board wins the match.

Tetris 99 was released as a free digital download for Nintendo Switch Online subscribers. Paid downloadable content and a retail edition have released subsequently. It received favorable reception from critics, has been nominated for several awards, and has been played by over 2 million players. Arika would later develop similar games to Tetris 99 for other popular video game series.

Gameplay

Tetris 99 is a multiplayer puzzle game in which 99 players play against each other at the same time, with the aim to be the last player remaining. As with the traditional Tetris formula, players rotate and drop shaped bricks known as tetrominoes onto a board. Players can clear tetrominoes by completing rows across both sides, whereas players will lose if tetrominoes overflow off the top of the board. As with modern Tetris rules, players have the option to store a tetromino piece to swap out at any time. By clearing multiple lines or performing continuous line clears in a row, players can send "garbage" to other players, which will appear on their board unless they can quickly clear lines in response. More garbage can be sent by completing combination moves in succession of making a "tetris" (matching 4 lines at once) or performing a "T-spin" (squeezing the T-shaped tetromino into a position it would otherwise not fall into by rapidly rotating it).

During gameplay, small grids representing the other 98 players are displayed at the sides of the main board. Players can either choose to target individual players, or have the computer automatically target other players based on one of four criteria: random players, those who are targeting the player, those who are close to being defeated, and those who possess badges. Badges are earned by knocking out a player with garbage (or gray lines), which earns them a piece of a badge, along with any other badges or pieces that player had. The more badges a player completes and possesses, the more lines they can send to other players at a time (up to a 100% boost). At the end of a game, players will earn experience that will increase their level. The game periodically features special "Maximus Cup" events; one of the first Maximus Cups was held in March 2019 where players with the top number of wins over a weekend play period would win rewards within the My Nintendo loyalty program. Many of these events offer players the opportunity to earn special in-game themes based on other Nintendo Switch games.

In May 2019, Nintendo released paid downloadable content (DLC) for the game, named the Big Block DLC. The DLC adds 4 offline modes in total: Marathon, the traditional single-player Tetris mode where play continues until the stack reaches the top of the well; CPU Battle, where players battle 98 bot players; Local Arena, where up to eight Nintendo Switch players play in the same arena via local wireless; and Two Player Share Battle, where two players share Joy-Con and play the same game in local co-op.

Development
Tetris 99 was announced during a Nintendo Direct presentation on February 13, 2019, and made available later that day. It is available for free exclusively to players who have subscribed to the Nintendo Switch Online service. Nintendo released a physical version of the game in Japan on August 9, 2019, in North America on September 6, 2019, and in Europe on September 20, 2019. The physical edition includes the Big Block DLC content and a 12-month Nintendo Switch Online voucher.

Reception

Upon release, Tetris 99 received "generally favorable reviews" according to the review aggregator Metacritic. According to IGN Tetris 99 is a "wondrous pandemonium in a battle royale bottle" and that "the massive player count really ups the intensity." The Telegraph said the game is "fiercer than Fortnite" and "as exciting and cutthroat as any video game deathmatch."

During a financial results briefing, Nintendo president Shuntaro Furukawa reported that Tetris 99 had been played by over 2.8 million accounts as of April 2019. Furukawa also noted that the game has boosted "user engagement" with the Nintendo Switch.

Alexey Pajitnov, the creator of the original Tetris, stated that he, "love[s] the game" and called it, "one of the best games of Tetris of the last year. I really like what was done."

Awards

Notes

References

External links
 
 Tetris website

2019 video games
Arika games
Nintendo games
Nintendo Switch games 
Nintendo Switch-only games 
Puzzle video games
Battle royale games
Video games developed in Japan
Tetris